Altino Arantes Marques (1876–1965) was a President of São Paulo. He was born in Batatais and graduated from the Law School of São Paulo in 1895. He was a member of  the Paulista Republican Party. Before he became the President of the state of São Paulo, he was a federal deputy for two terms: (1906–1908) and (1909–1911). He was also Secretary of State of the Interior from 1911 to 1915.

Presidency
During his administration, the second artificial valorisation (price setting) of coffee was promoted (the first was in 1906, by the Tabuaté Agreement). With the frost of 1918, this product, doubled in price in the Santos' Port, giving the Altino Arantes government much revenue. With reduced production, it was possible to put the price premium into the world market, allowing the government to take control of the Sorocabana Railroad from a North-American group.

After the Presidency

Between 1921 and 1930 Altino Arantes was a federal deputy again. In 1947 he was a constituent deputy and, again, a federal deputy. He was a member of the Republican Party, and ran for vice president with Cristiano Machado in the 1950 Brazilian presidential election, coming third with 24.4% of the vote. He was the first President of the Banespa, became a member and President of the Paulist Academy of Words and member of the Historic and Geographic Institution of São Paulo. He died in São Paulo in 1965.

Legacy
Outside São Paulo Arantes is largely unknown, although his administration was amongst the more successful of the Brazilian Old Republic.

References

External links
Official gallery of the Governors of São Paulo

1876 births
1965 deaths
Governors of São Paulo (state)
University of São Paulo alumni
Government ministers of Brazil
Republican Party (Brazil) politicians
Members of the Chamber of Deputies (Brazil) from São Paulo

Candidates for Vice President of Brazil